FC Avangard (Avangard Fýtbol Klýby) is a defunct Kazakhstani football club that was based in Petropavl. The club won the Kazakhstan First Division in 2006, but were refused promoted to the Kazakhstan Super League due financial constraints.

History
The club was formed in 2005, before ceasing to exist at the end of the 2008 season.

Domestic history

Honours
Kazakhstan First Division (1): 2006

References

External links

Defunct football clubs in Kazakhstan
2005 establishments in Kazakhstan
Association football clubs established in 2005
Association football clubs disestablished in 2008